Bethanne McCarthy Patrick (born April 20, 1970) is an American Republican Party politician who has represented the 3rd Legislative District in the New Jersey General Assembly since she took office on January 11, 2022.

McCarthy Patrick is an emergency medical technician for Inspira Health. She served on the board of education of the Mannington Township School District from 2019 to 2021.

New Jersey Assembly
In the 2022 general election, McCarthy Patrick, together with her Republican running mates Beth Sawyer in the Assembly and Edward Durr in the Senate, knocked off Democratic incumbents Stephen M. Sweeney in the Senate and John Burzichelli and Adam Taliaferro in the Assembly. Before the election, the district had been viewed as a "solidly 'blue'" safe district for Democrats.

McCarthy Patrick was one of a record seven new Republican Assemblywomen elected in the 2022 general election, joining seven Republican women incumbents who won re-election that year.

Committees 
Committee assignments for the current session are:
Environment and Solid Waste
Health
Housing

District 3 
Each of the 40 districts in the New Jersey Legislature has one representative in the New Jersey Senate and two members in the New Jersey General Assembly. Each of the 40 districts in the New Jersey Legislature has one representative in the New Jersey Senate and two members in the New Jersey General Assembly. Representatives from the 3rd District for the 2022—2023 Legislative Session are:
Senator Edward Durr (R)
Assemblywoman Bethanne McCarthy Patrick (R)
Assemblywoman Beth Sawyer (R)

Electoral history

Assembly

References

External links
Legislative webpage

Living people
1970 births
Emergency medical technicians
Republican Party members of the New Jersey General Assembly
People from Mannington Township, New Jersey
Politicians from Salem County, New Jersey
School board members in New Jersey
Women state legislators in New Jersey
21st-century American politicians
21st-century American women politicians